Marondera Airport  is an airport serving Marondera, Zimbabwe.

See also
Transport in Zimbabwe
List of airports in Zimbabwe

References

External links
 Great Circle Mapper - Marondera
 Marondera Airport
 OurAirports - Marondera
 OpenStreeMap - Marondera

Airports in Zimbabwe